Rhabdopsora is a genus of fungi in the family Verrucariaceae.

References

External links
Index Fungorum

Eurotiomycetes genera
Lichen genera